The European records in swimming are the fastest times ever swum by a swimmer representing a member federation of the Ligue Européenne de Natation (LEN), Europe's governing body of swimming.

Records can be set in long course (50 metres) or short course (25 metres) swimming pools, with records currently recorded in the following events for both men and women.
Freestyle: 50 m, 100 m, 200 m, 400 m, 800 m, 1500 m
Backstroke: 50 m, 100 m, 200 m
Breaststroke: 50 m, 100 m, 200 m
Butterfly: 50 m, 100 m, 200 m
Individual medley: 100 m (short course only), 200 m, 400 m
Relays: 4×50 m freestyle (short course only), 4 × 100 m freestyle, 4 × 200 m freestyle, 4×50 m medley (short course only), 4 × 100 m medley

The ratification process and involves submission of an application by the national federation to LEN detailing the name(s) of the swimmer, time swum, date and location of the swim, names of officials and the swimsuit model worn. Upon ratification, the records appear on the official records listing. Records marked with a hash (#) are currently awaiting ratification by LEN or have been obtained since the last version of the official lists. All records were achieved in finals unless otherwise specified.

Long course (50 m)

Men

Women

Mixed relay

Short course (25 m)

Men

Women

Mixed relay

Record holders' rankings

By nation

By athlete (men)

By athlete (women)

Notes

C1: Record set by CN Marseille club team.
WB: World all-time best performances. FINA does not recognise 4×50 m relays and therefore does not ratify any official world records for these events. LEN does recognise these events as official and ratifies European records for them. European SC Championships are the most important international meets where these events are held: during these meets, world best performances are usually announced as world records even though they are not.
<1: Alain Bernard of France swam a time of 46.94 in the semifinal of the men's 100 m freestyle at the 2009 French Championships, however the record was not ratified by LEN.

References
General
European records 13 August 2022 updated
Specific

External links
LEN Official Website.
SwimRankings.net, LEN's Official results database.

Europe
Swimming
Records